Mike Ricci may refer to:
 Mike Ricci (ice hockey)
 Mike Ricci (fighter)